ZJ or zJ may refer to:

 ZJ theorem, a mathematical theorem proven by George Glauberman
 Jeep Grand Cherokee (ZJ), an automobile style used in the Jeep Grand Cherokee and the Jeep Grand Wagoneer
 Zambezi Airlines (IATA airline designator )
 Zeptojoule (zJ), an SI unit of energy
 Zettajoule (ZJ), an SI unit of energy
 Zhejiang, a province of China (Guobiao abbreviation ZJ)